Thomas Joseph Re (2 February 1913 – 5 February 1996) was  a former Australian rules footballer who played with Fitzroy in the Victorian Football League (VFL).

Re later served in the Australian Army during World War II.

Notes

External links 

		
Tom Re's playing statistics from The VFA Project

1913 births
1996 deaths
Australian rules footballers from Melbourne
Fitzroy Football Club players
Military personnel from Melbourne
Australian Army personnel of World War II